Dad's Girl (Arabic: غنوجة بيّـا) is a 2007 Lebanese film by Elie F. Habib. It tells the story of a young lady who is spoiled and loved by her father, who insists she marry her previous lover. غنوجة بيّـا was Habeebs commercially and successful movie that hit in the Middle East. Dad's Girl (Arabic: ''غنوجة بيّـا') was rated the funniest comedy movie sequel to ever be released in Lebanon. It's the awaited sequel to the very successful family romantic comedy T.V Series written by Mona Tayeh.

Plot
Dad's Girl is a romantic comedy movie that takes place in the south side of Lebanon. Rana Barakat (Rita Barsona) a single adult who is spoiled and loved by her father Fareed Barakat (Antoine Balaban) dearly. Rana goes through a lot of obstacles because her father wants her to get married before he dies. Tarek Fayad (Peter Semaan) is the "lover boy" who is in love with Rana Barakat and is trying his very best to get her attention in order they get married because her father trusts him with his life. Then there is, Nadine Kenaan (Nadine Al Rassi) and her husband Shadi Kenaan (Ghassan Saleem) who are not getting along because Shadi married her to get the French passport she has, as well, he wants to leave Lebanon but she refuses. Since conflict kept on going between Nadine and Shadi, therefore, Shadi decided to leave and go to Paris, while Nadine stayed and found out that she is pregnant.

Conflicts emerge when one of Tarek's ex-girlfriend Dollie (Rania Issa) has mental issues because she was madly in love with him and he ended up leaving her for Rana. Though, Tarek goes back to Dollie after he finds out that Rana does not want him for the future because she is scared that he might hurt her again.

After a few days Dollie and Rana bump into each other at the hair salon and Dollie shows off her engagement ring to Rana and says that Tarek proposed to her. As well, she tells her the engagement party will be at the Casino she performs at, which makes Rana feel this is revenge and the couple is getting back at her. While at the ceremony, Rana performs and then a few seconds later Dollie goes up on stage and a feud happens between both. Then Rana's maid Sabah (Abeer Aoun) takes scissors and cuts open Dollie's dress, which leaves her embarrassed and she runs off from the ceremony. After that, a huge fight happens between Dollie's family and Rana's security guards, which ends them up at the police station. After waiting a few hours in the police station Tarek paid bail for everyone because it was midnight and no one wanted to sleep in jail that late.

After everyone got out of jail, Tarek told Rana that her actions were not acceptable and that she has to face the consequences alone if Dollie decided to file a lawsuit against her. As well, he tells Rana to admit that she is jealous but Rana still denies the fact she loves him.

While all this happens, Nadine and Shadi re-connect with each other, which makes Nadine fly off to Paris and Shadi goes back to Lebanon, though, they did not know that they would leave and not find each other. Therefore, they have a small argument over the phone but then express their love together and Shadi waits till Nadine gets back to Lebanon.

Meanwhile, Tarek goes to Dollie's house and Dollie goes insane since she thought Tarek went off and saw Rana after the conflict in the Casino. He denies that fact but this urges Dollie to go insane and decides to kill Rana, because she knows Tarek is lying to her. Tarek realizes that Dollie was not joking and runs off to find Rana, but Dollie found her first and as soon as Tarek arrives Rana's house, Dollie has stabbed Rana and she is rushed to the hospital. On the way to the hospital, Tarek asks Rana on what happened and she confesses that she loves him and she cannot live without him and then she loses consciousness.

The movie ends with Rana in the hospital and is gathered around by family and friends. Then a few weeks later Tarek takes Rana to a private area along the beachside and proposes to her. Of course, Rana accepts and they end it with a slow dance.

Cast
 Rita Barsona as Rana Barakat 
 Peter Semaan as Tarek Fayad 
 Antoine Balban as Fareed Barakat 
 Nadine Al Rassi as Nadine Kenaan 
 Ghassan Saleem as Shadi Kenaan 
 Rania Issa as Dolly
 Abeer Aoun as Sabah

References

External links
Circuitplanete.com

Lebanese comedy films
2006 films